The Independent Pilots Association (IPA) is the union representing the collective bargaining interests of over 2800 airline pilots employed by United Parcel Service (UPS). The organization was founded in 1990 and is headquartered in Louisville, Kentucky, where UPS's main air hub is located.

IPA Foundation

Since the early days of the association, the IPA leadership has felt it was important for the membership to be represented to the public in a philanthropic endeavor. Therefore, the Independent Pilots Association Foundation, or IPA Foundation, was officially formed in late 1993. The first fiscal year began on July 1, 1994, and since then the Foundation has functioned as a separate entity, entirely self-sufficient, operated solely from the donations received through its members. As a separate entity, the IPA Foundation conforms to existing labor laws as well as sec. 501(c)(3) of the IRS code.

Government affairs

The IPA Government Affairs Missions statement is: "To promote global aviation safety and security and encourage continued economic growth for the aviation industry".  The IPA is a member of The Coalition of Airline Pilots Associations - CAPA.

The IPA has filed suit on December 22, 2011, against the FAA to mandate new rest and duty regulations apply to all cargo airlines as well as passenger airlines.

Historical actions

The association honored the picket lines when the Teamsters went on strike in 1997 for 16 days.

References

External links

Independent Pilots Association
The Coalition of Airline Pilots Associations
United Parcel Service

Trade unions in the United States
Airline pilots' trade unions
Trade unions established in 1990